Anna Vitalyevna Shevchenko (born 4 August 1993) is a Kazakhstani cross-country skier who competes internationally.

She competed for Kazakhstan at the FIS Nordic World Ski Championships 2017 in Lahti, Finland.

Cross-country skiing results
All results are sourced from the International Ski Federation (FIS).

Olympic Games

World Championships

World Cup

Season standings

References

External links

1993 births
Living people
Kazakhstani female cross-country skiers
Tour de Ski skiers
Universiade medalists in cross-country skiing
Cross-country skiers at the 2018 Winter Olympics
Olympic cross-country skiers of Kazakhstan
Universiade bronze medalists for Kazakhstan
Competitors at the 2017 Winter Universiade
Universiade silver medalists for Kazakhstan
Universiade gold medalists for Kazakhstan
21st-century Kazakhstani women